Robert Leroy "Roy" Cochran (January 28, 1886 – February 23, 1963) was an American Democratic politician and the 24th Governor of Nebraska.

Cochran was born in Avoca, Nebraska and began his education in a sod school house. After graduating from Brady High school, he worked his way through and received a civil engineering degree from the University of Nebraska in 1910. First working for the County Surveyor, he was hired as a surveyor by the Atchison, Topeka, and Santa Fe Railroad. In 1912 he was elected County Surveyor and served in that position until 1916. During World War I, he served two years in the Army Artillery Corps and was discharged with the rank of captain in 1919. He was married to Aileen Gant on March 15, 1919, and the couple had two children, Robert Leroy Jr and Mary Aileen.

Career
Cochran ran for governor of Nebraska and won in 1934, defeating the Republican candidate, Dwight Griswold, by 17,388 votes (50,8% to 47.7%). He was re-elected in 1936, again defeating Griswold, this time by 55.9% to 43.1%. In 1938 he was elected for a third term as governor, defeating the Republican candidate, Charles J. Warner, by 44% to 40.6%; a third candidate, Charles W. Bryan, received 15.4% of the vote. This made him the first governor to serve three consecutive terms. In 1940 he ran unsuccessfully for Nebraska senator, unseating incumbent Edward R. Burke in the Democratic primary, but losing the general election to Hugh Butler by 57% to 41.5%.

Cochran served as a colonel in the U.S. Army during World War II from 1941 to 1942 at Camp Leonard Wood, Missouri. He became Assistant Commissioner of the Federal Public Housing Authority from 1942 to 1943, and Commissioner from 1943 to 1944. He served as Deputy Commissioner of the American Mission for Aid to Greece. He retired from public life in 1956.

Death and legacy
Cochran died on February 23, 1963, and is interred at Lincoln Memorial Park in Lincoln, Nebraska. 
He was a member of the Episcopal Church, a Freemason, Knight Templar, Shriner, and member of Alpha Tau Omega.

References

External links
 
 Encyclopedia of Nebraska
 National Governors Association

Further reading 
Grimes, Mary Cochran, Aileen and Roy: From Sod House to State House (Lincoln: University of Nebraska Press, 2010).

|-

|-

|-

1886 births
1963 deaths
20th-century American politicians
Democratic Party governors of Nebraska
University of Nebraska alumni
20th-century American Episcopalians